Cedeño is one of the thirteen municipalities of the state of Monagas in Venezuela. It is located in the northwest of the state.

Important urban centres 
Areo
Caicara de Maturín
San Félix de Cantalicio

Economy 
Agriculture is the main economic activity. Sweet paprika, cotton, beans, maize, potatoes, watermelons, tomatoes and soja are some of the most important products.

The municipality has an agro-industrial complex where Juana Rámirez corn flour is produced.

Politics and government

Mayors 
 Pedro Briceño. (2004 - 2008), (2008 - 2013) PSUV.
 Wilma Carvajal. (2013 - 2017) PSUV.

References

Municipalities of Monagas